Jean Le Noir (1622, Alençon - 22 April 1692, in prison, in the château de Nantes) was a French theologian and canon lawyer.

1622 births
1692 deaths
17th-century French Catholic theologians
Writers from Alençon
French male writers
Canon law jurists